The Anaphylaxis Campaign was renamed Anaphylaxis UK in July 2022. 

Anaphylaxis UK' is a British charity that solely supports people at risk from severe allergic reactions. For over 25 years, the charity has provided information and support to patients and their families.

Anaphylaxis UK was created to ensure a safe environment for all people with allergies by working with and educating the food industry, schools, pre-schools, colleges, health professionals and other key audiences. It focuses on medical facts, food labelling, risk reduction and allergen management.

The charity also trains patients, carers and healthcare professionals through its AllergyWise online training. It actively campaigns to raise awareness of anaphylaxis with the general public and with the relevant authorities for better allergy care and treatments.

Origins and key people
The Campaign was established in 1994 following the deaths of four people from allergic reactions to nuts. Its founder and honorary president, David Reading, was made OBE in the 2005 New Year's Honours List for services to people with allergies.

The Campaign's former honorary president is William Frankland, the pioneer immunologist, who died in April 2020.

Olympic swimmer Mark Foster has been the Campaign's patron since 2009. His friend and fellow-athlete, Ross Baillie died following an anaphylactic reaction in 1999.

Chef Giorgio Locatelli and global parenting expert Jo Frost are also patrons of the Anaphylaxis Campaign.

In 2020, the Anaphylaxis Campaign appointed Dan Kelly, founder of the ‘May Contain’ blog (Instagram @_maycontain) and podcast, as youth ambassador. In this role, Dan works with the charity to support and empower young people living with severe allergies.

Professor John Warner, Professor of Paediatrics, Imperial College, London and Hon.Professor University of Cape Town, South Africa, became the Anaphylaxis Campaign's Clinical and Scientific Advisory Panel chair in 2020.

Simon Williams is currently Chief Executive of Anaphylaxis UK.

Making Schools Safer
The Campaign's Making Schools Safer campaign provides schools with the knowledge and expertise to support severely allergic children. This includes free school resources, presentations and free online e-learning AllergyWise courses.

For two years the Anaphylaxis Campaign – together with Allergy UK, the British Society for Allergy & Clinical Immunology (BSACI), the British Paediatric Allergy Immunity and Infection Group (BPAIIG), and the Royal College of Paediatrics and Child Health (RCPCH) – campaigned for a change in the law to allow schools to hold generic adrenaline auto-injectors, and ensure they have sufficient trained staff to operate the device in case of an emergency.

From 1 October 2017, the Human Medicines (Amendment) Regulations 2017 has allowed schools in the UK to buy adrenaline auto-injector devices (known as AAIs) without a prescription to use in an emergency on children who are at risk of a severe allergic reaction (known as anaphylaxis) but whose own device is not available or not working. This could be because their AAI(s) are broken, or out of date, for example.

Universities
The Anaphylaxis Campaign has identified that 16- to 24-year-olds are a high-risk group when it comes to managing their allergies, and this includes university students. An allergy toolkit was devised, including a booklet with practical tips on preparation and management of allergies in a university setting. Working closely with ‘The University and Catering Organisation’ & ‘Association of Student Residential Accommodation’, The campaign raised awareness of issues around allergy management through e -newsletters and speaking at regional meetings.

Through a partnership with the FSA and Allergy UK, the Anaphylaxis Campaign collaborated on a campaign ‘Easy to Ask’, designed to empower young people to ask food businesses about allergens when eating out. This campaign had extensive reach and media interest.

A high-impact video called "Take the Kit" was designed and used in a public awareness campaign, to highlight the risks of not carrying adrenaline at all times. This was aimed at 15- to 25-year-olds and reached 900,000 people worldwide.

National lobbying to July 2022
The Anaphylaxis Campaign is a founder member of the National Allergy Strategy Group, a coalition of charities, professional organisations and industry, that seeks to improve health services for allergy sufferers in the UK.

The charity has called for clearer guidelines and greater consistency on food labelling. It has also lobbied to remove what it considers to be unnecessary 'may contain' labelling, arguing that food manufacturers should only use these labels when there is a genuine risk to allergy sufferers.

The Anaphylaxis Campaign has tried to raise awareness of the problems caused by inconsistency in how severe allergy is diagnosed. To help improve awareness among frontline medical practitioners, it launched an online training programme, called AllergyWise, in 2011, accredited by the Royal College of Nursing.

In March 2011, the charity held a national conference with the Food Standards Agency, the UK government department, on 'Communicating the science of food allergy'.

Membership schemes to July 2022

The Anaphylaxis Campaign ran three membership schemes. These were Individual,  Corporate and Healthcare Professional.

Individual members received tailored information related to their allergy or the allergy of their child, including product alerts. They also received regular newsletters and had access to the charity's Tried and Trusted directory of places to eat.

The membership fee for individuals was removed in 2022. The move enabled the charity to expand and offer its services to more people living with a serious allergy.

Healthcare professionals with an interest in severe allergy continue to receive tailored advice through the Healthcare Professional membership scheme, as well as access to expert-led conference events and national helpline, and Royal College of Nursing accredited training through the online AllergyWise courses.

The Corporate Membership benefits companies and those working in the food industry. The scheme provides information and advice to keep businesses up to date with news and views in the world of allergy. This includes discounted tickets to the annual corporate conference and regular newsletters. 

The Corporate Membership scheme was reformed in July 2022 and re-named as Business Membership with additional support for smaller businesses.

See also
 Anaphylaxis
 Allergy

References

External links
 Official site
 
 National Allergy Strategy Group

Allergy organizations
Farnborough, Hampshire
Food allergy organizations
Health campaigns
Health charities in the United Kingdom
Health in Hampshire
Organisations based in Hampshire